Buncha Yimchoi (born May 24, 1990) is a Thai professional footballer who plays as a goalkeeper.

External links

1990 births
Living people
Buncha Yimchoi
Buncha Yimchoi
Buncha Yimchoi
Buncha Yimchoi
Buncha Yimchoi
Association football goalkeepers
Buncha Yimchoi
Buncha Yimchoi